Spiros Wallace "Wally" Stieffen (April 29, 1925 – August 20, 2017) was an American politician who served as a Democratic member of the Virginia House of Delegates from 1978 until 1994, until declining to seek re-election.

References

External links
 
 

1925 births
2017 deaths
Democratic Party members of the Virginia House of Delegates
Virginia Tech alumni
20th-century American politicians